The Hawker Hotspur was a Hawker Henley redesigned to take a Boulton-Paul semi-powered four gun turret. It was designed in response to Air Ministry Specification F.9/35, which required a powered turret as the main armament to replace the Hawker Demon.

Design and development
In the same fashion as the Henley, the Hotspur used standard Hawker Hurricane outer wing panels. One prototype aircraft, K8309, was built in 1937, fitted with armament of four 0.303 in (7.7 mm) Browning machine guns in a Boulton Paul dorsal turret plus one .303 in (7.7 mm) Vickers machine gun mounted in the front fuselage. The completion of the prototype  was delayed until 1938, by which time the rival Boulton Paul Defiant had already flown. The Hotspur first flew on 14 June 1938 with only a wooden mock-up of the turret and with ballast equivalent to the weight of armament.

Testing and evaluation
As Hawker was committed to the production of Hurricanes and Gloster to Henley production, there was insufficient capacity to introduce another type and production was abandoned. The mock-up turret was removed and a cockpit fairing installed. Planned production by Avro to Specification 17/36 was abandoned and the prototype, less turret, was used at the RAE Farnborough to test flap and dive brake configurations until 1942.

Specifications (Hotspur)

See also

References

Notes

Bibliography

 Brew, Alex. The Turret Fighters – Defiant and Roc. Ramsbury, Marlborough, Wiltshire, UK: Crowood Press, 2002. .
 Hannah, Donald. Hawker FlyPast Reference Library. Stamford, Lincolnshire, UK: Key Publishing Ltd., 1982. .
 James, Derek N. Hawker, an Aircraft Album No. 5. New York: Arco Publishing Company, 1973. . (First published in the UK by Ian Allan in 1972.)
 Mason, Francis K. The British Fighter since 1912. Annapolis, MD: US Naval Institute Press, 1992. .
 Mason, Francis K. Hawker Aircraft since 1920. Annapolis, MD: US Naval Institute Press, 1991. . (3rd US edition, originally published in the UK by Putnam Aeronautical Books in 1961 and 1971)

External links

 Hawker Hotspur – British Aircraft of World War II

1930s British experimental aircraft
Hotspur
1930s British fighter aircraft
Cancelled military aircraft projects of the United Kingdom
Turret fighters
Single-engined tractor aircraft
Low-wing aircraft
Aircraft first flown in 1938